Dactylioglypha tonica is a moth of the family Tortricidae. It is found in Thailand, Japan, Malaysia, Taiwan, Sri Lanka and Australia.

The wingspan is about 12 mm. The forewings are fuscous with a deep blackish-purple triangular apical spot. The hindwings are dark fuscous.

The species has a unique relationship with fungi that cover the cocoon. The fungi have antibacterial properties and could protect pupae from bacterial infections.

References

Moths described in 1909
Olethreutini
Moths of Japan